The 2018 FIBA Europe Cup Finals will be the concluding games of the 2017–18 FIBA Europe Cup season. The Finals will be played in a two-legged format, with the first leg being played on April 25 and the second one on 2 May 2018.

For the second consecutive time, two teams from the same country will meet in the final.

Venue
The Palasport Giacomo Del Mauro was the first venue. The Palasport originally had a 3,600 seating capacity. It was expanded to a 5,300 seating capacity in 2008, specifically in order to meet the minimum capacity requirements for EuroLeague games, which require an arena of at least 5,000 seats. In 2008, the arena's usage rights were also entrusted to Air Avellino, for a period of ten years.

The Palasport Giuseppe Taliercio in Venice, the venue for the second leg, opened in 1978. It was used as one of the host arenas of the 1979 EuroBasket. It has most notably been used as the home arena of the Italian basketball club, Reyer Venezia Mestre, of the Lega Basket Serie A. The Italian club Basket Mestre 1958 also used the arena at one time.

Road to the Finals

Note: In the table, the score of the finalist is given first (H = home; A = away).

First leg

Second leg

References

See also
2018 EuroLeague Final Four
2018 EuroCup Finals
2018 Basketball Champions League Final Four

2018
2017–18 FIBA Europe Cup
April 2018 sports events in Europe
May 2018 sports events in Europe
2017–18 in Italian basketball
International basketball competitions hosted by Italy